A general assembly or general meeting is a meeting of all the members of an organization or shareholders of a company.

Specific examples of general assembly include:

Churches
 General Assembly (presbyterian church), the highest court of presbyterian polity
General Assembly of the Church of Scotland, highest court of the Church of Scotland
General Assembly of the Presbyterian Church in Ireland, highest court of the Presbyterian Church in Ireland
General Assembly (Unitarian Universalist Association), annual gathering of Unitarian Universalists of the Unitarian Universalist Association 
General Assembly of Unitarian and Free Christian Churches, umbrella organisation for Unitarian, Free Christian and other religious congregations in the United Kingdom
 General Ordinary Assembly, advisory body for the Pope in the Catholic Church
 World Evangelical Alliance#General Assemblies

International organizations
FIA General Assembly, an international motor-racing organization
General Assembly of the Organization of American States, the main body of the OAS
United Nations General Assembly, one of the six principal organs of the United Nations

National or sub-national legislatures
Confederate Ireland's parliament, during 1642–1649
General Assembly of Nova Scotia, the legislature of that Canadian province 
General Assembly of Uruguay, the national legislature of Uruguay

United States state legislatures
 Arkansas General Assembly
 Colorado General Assembly
 Connecticut General Assembly
 Delaware General Assembly
 Georgia General Assembly
 Illinois General Assembly
 Indiana General Assembly
 Iowa General Assembly
 Kentucky General Assembly
 Maryland General Assembly
 Missouri General Assembly
 New Jersey General Assembly, lower house of the bicameral New Jersey Legislature
 New York General Assembly (historical colonial)
 North Carolina General Assembly
 Ohio General Assembly
 Pennsylvania General Assembly
 Rhode Island General Assembly
 South Carolina General Assembly
 Tennessee General Assembly
 Vermont General Assembly
 Virginia General Assembly

Other uses
 General Assembly (horse), American throughbred racehorse
 General assembly (Occupy movement), the primary decision making bodies of the global Occupy Movement which arose in 2011
 General Assembly (school), a private for-profit education company

See also
Annual general meeting
Popular assembly, a gathering called to address issues of importance to participants
 ICCA Congress & Exhibition, the annual meeting of the International Congress and Convention Association
 Conference
 Assembly (disambiguation)
 Landsgemeinde, institution of direct democracy in some Swiss cantons

References